Mary Abigail Kawenaulaokalaniahiiakaikapoliopele Naleilehuaapele Wiggin Pukui (20 April 1895 – 21 May 1986), known as Kawena, was a Hawaiian scholar, author, composer, hula expert, and educator.

Life 
Pukui was born on April 20, 1895, in her grandmother's home, named Hale Ola, in Haniumalu, Kau, on Hawaii Island, to Henry Nathaniel Wiggin (originally from Salem, Massachusetts, of a distinguished shipping family descended from Massachusetts Bay Colony governor Simon Bradstreet and his wife, the poet Anne Bradstreet) and Mary Paahana Kanakaole, descendant of a long line of kahuna (priests) going back centuries. Pukui's maternal grandmother, Naliipoaimoku, was a kahuna laau lapaau (medicinal expert) and kahuna pale keiki (midwife) and a hula dancer in Queen Emma's court. She had delivered the child, and asked Pukui's parents for the child to raise in the traditional way, and her request was granted. Kawena was born into the Fire Clan of Kau. Kawena and her grandmother were inseparable, and the child was taught many things she needed to know. Upon the death of her grandmother, Kawena returned to live with her parents. Her mother continued her education in things Hawaiian and her father, who spoke Hawaiian fluently, only spoke to her in English and taught her of his New England heritage. Kawena was forever grateful for the years she spent with her grandmother.

Pukui was educated in the Hawaiian Mission Academy, and taught Hawaiiana at Punahou School. Pukui was fluent in the Hawaiian language, and from the age of 15 collected and translated folk tales, proverbs and sayings. She worked at the Bernice P. Bishop Museum from 1938 to 1961 as an ethnological assistant and translator. She also taught Hawaiian to several scholars and served as an informant for numerous anthropologists. She published more than 50 scholarly works. Pukui is the co-author of the definitive Hawaiian-English Dictionary (1957, revised 1986), Place Names of Hawaii (1974), and The Echo of Our Song (1974), a translation of old chants and songs. Her book, Ōlelo Noeau, contains nearly 3,000 examples of Hawaiian proverbs and poetical sayings, translated and annotated. The two-volume set Nānā i ke Kumu, Look to the Source, is an invaluable resource on Hawaiian customs and traditions. She was a chanter and hula expert, and wrote lyrics and music to more than 150 Hawaiian songs.

In addition to her published works, Pukui's knowledge was also preserved in her notes, oral histories, hundreds of audiotape recordings from the 1950s and 1960s, and a few film clips, all collected in the Bishop Museum. She is often credited with making the Hawaiian Renaissance of the 1970s possible.

She was named a "Living Treasure of Hawaii" by the Honpa Hongwanji Mission of Hawaii in 1977. In 1995, she was inducted into the Hawaiian Music Hall of Fame. In March 2017, Hawaii Magazine ranked her among a list of the most influential women in Hawaiian history.

Bibliography (selected) 
In order of first publication:
1933: Hawaiian Folk Tales, Third Series
1934: Outline of Hawaiian Physical Therapeutics; with Handy and Livermore
1943: Introduction to the Hawaiian Language; with Henry P. Judd and John F. G. Stokes
1957: Hawaiian-English Dictionary; with Elbert (1957, rev. and enl. 1986) PDF Version
1957: The Polynesian Family System in Ka'u, Hawaii; with Handy, Edward Smith Craighill * PDF Version
1966:  PDF Version
1972: Nānā i ke Kumu, Look to the Source, Vol. 1 and Vol. 2; with Haertig and Lee. PDF Versions: Vol. 1 and Vol. 2
1972: Native Planters in Old Hawaii: Their Life, Lore, and Environment; with Edward Smith Craighill Handy; Elizabeth Green Handy. Honolulu: Bishop Museum Press; Revised edition (1991). .
1974: Place Names of Hawaii; with Elbert and Mookini
1974: The Echo of Our Song: Chants and Poems of the Hawaiians
1979:  PDF Version
1980: Hula: Historical Perspectives; with Dorothy B. Barère and Marion Kelly
1983: ‘Ōlelo No‘eau: Hawaiian proverbs & poetical sayings Honolulu, Hawai'i: Bishop Museum Press 
Nā Wahine: Hawaiian proverbs and inspirational quotes celebrating women in Hawai'i. Honolulu: Mutual, 2002 
Hula: Hawaiian proverbs and inspirational quotes celebrating hula in Hawai'i Honolulu: Mutual, 2003 
1989: 
1990: 
1992: 
»Partial preview of 
1994: The Water of Kāne; and other legends of the Hawaiian Islands; retold by Caroline Curtis; rev. ed. Honolulu, Hawaiʻi: Kamehameha Schools Press  PDF Version
1995: Handy Hawai‘ian Dictionary; with Judd and Stokes 
1996: Hawai‘i Island Legends: Pikoi, Pele and Others; compiler; retold by Caroline Curtis. PDF Version

References

Further reading 

1895 births
1986 deaths
Native Hawaiian musicians
Native Hawaiian people
Hawaiian adoptees (hānai)
20th-century American musicians